The Floral Hall was an entertainment venue in Scarborough, North Yorkshire, England. It was demolished in 1989 and replaced by the Scarborough Bowls Centre.

References

External links 
 Floral Hall: An Introduction | Stories From Scarborough
 Floral Hall | Flickr

Theatres in Scarborough, North Yorkshire
Demolished buildings and structures in England
Demolished theatres in the United Kingdom
Buildings and structures demolished in 1989